
Thomas Paton may refer to:
 Thomas Angus Lyall Paton or Angus Paton, (1905–1999), British civil engineer
 Tom Paton (ice hockey) (1854–1909), Canadian goaltender
 Tom Paton (footballer), (1881–1922), Scottish footballer
 Tam Paton (born Thomas Dougal Paton, 1938–2009), manager of the Bay City Rollers

See also
 Tom Patton (born 1953), American politician
Thomas Patten (disambiguation)